Charles Gondouin (21 July 1875 in Paris – 25 December 1947 in Paris) was a French rugby union player and tug of war competitor, who competed in the 1900 Summer Olympics. He was a member of the French rugby union team, which won the gold medal. Gondouin studied at the Lycée Condorcet, then worked as a sports journalist. He also participated in the tug of war competition and won a silver medal as a member of French team. He was killed on Christmas Eve when he was struck by a car in Paris while returning from a meeting for a racing club in france.

References

External links

profile

1875 births
1947 deaths
Rugby union players from Paris
French rugby union players
Rugby union players at the 1900 Summer Olympics
Tug of war competitors at the 1900 Summer Olympics
Olympic rugby union players of France
Olympic tug of war competitors of France
Olympic gold medalists for France
Olympic silver medalists for France
Olympic medalists in tug of war
Medalists at the 1900 Summer Olympics
Pedestrian road incident deaths
Road incident deaths in France